Aquatic plants are used to give the aquarium a natural appearance, oxygenate the water, and provide habitat for fish, especially fry (babies) and for invertebrates. Some aquarium fish and invertebrates also eat live plants. Hobby aquarists use aquatic plants for aquascaping.

Marine algae are also included in this list for convenience, despite the fact that many species are technically classified as protists, not plants.

Brown macroalgae

Brown macroalgae are sometimes seasonally available in the aquarium trade and under suitable conditions, will grow quite prolifically. They possess the pigment Fucoxanthin which gives them their coloration ranging from yellow to dark brown. A few are desirable yet many are pests with some species being rather difficult to remove, often making their way into aquariums on live rock.

Green macroalgae

Green macroalgae are extremely diverse and abundant, coming in a wide variety of shapes. They possess the pigment Chlorophyll which gives them their coloration ranging from bright green to yellow or dark jade. Reproduction via fragmentation or the releasing of spores are utilized by this macroalgae group. The second option, which is used by the genus, Caulerpa, can be quite problematic in an aquarium. Some species of green macroalgae have greater ease surviving in high nutrient environments or inadequate water parameters than other kinds of macroalgae and are generally the most suitable for nutrient removal due to their rapid growth rates.

Red macroalgae

Red macroalgae are highly sought after in the aquarium trade given their intense coloration and striking appearance. They possess the pigment Phycoerythrin which gives them their vivid coloration ranging from red to orange to blue. For some species, identification is difficult and slight variations due to location and depth may exist.

Mangroves

Most mangroves that end up in the aquarium trade are either collected as seeds or grown on land. Their leaves should be exposed to the air, well beyond the surface of the water, and be sprayed with freshwater regularly to prevent salt buildup. They also require intense lighting and a layer of substrate, not too shallow as to let the tree topple over and not too fine which would make parts of the sandbed to go anaerobic.

Seagrass

Turtle grass, Thalassia hemprichii and Thalassia testudinum
Manatee grass, Syringodium filiforme

See also
List of freshwater aquarium plant species
List of brackish aquarium plant species
List of marine aquarium fish species
List of marine aquarium invertebrate species
Marine aquarium
Reef aquarium

References 

Fishkeeping
 Aquarium
Marine aquarium plant species